Edwin Everett Codman (December 19, 1875 – April 29, 1955) was an American sculptor. His work was part of the sculpture event in the art competition at the 1932 Summer Olympics. Codman committed suicide by shooting himself in 1955, after suffering from inoperable cancer for 2 years.
While working for Gorham Mfg., he designed and copyrighted a small bronze bust of Thomas Edison (3.75" tall) for an Electrical Convention (Sep 1910) in the Thousand Islands (at the Hotel Frontenac). Some 200 of these were distributed by the AEIC with the specific details engraved on the bases. Researcher Allen Koenigsberg is currently tracking the paper trail for these Souvenirs (weighing one pound each).

References

External links
 

1876 births
1955 suicides
20th-century American sculptors
American male sculptors
Olympic competitors in art competitions
Sculptors from London
Suicides by firearm in Vermont
1955 deaths
English emigrants to the United States
20th-century American male artists